The following is a list of charter schools in Georgia (including networks of such schools) grouped by county.

Statewide Locations
 Coastal Plains Education Center High School (17 schools)

Bibb County

 Academy for Classical Education
 Cirrus Academy Charter School

Bulloch County
 Statesboro STEAM College, Careers, Art & Technology Academy

Calhoun County
 Pataula Charter Academy

Cherokee County
 Cherokee Charter Academy

Clarke County
 Foothills Education Charter High School

Clayton County

 DuBois Integrity Academy
 Utopian Academy for the Arts

Cobb County

 International Academy of Smyrna
 Miles Ahead Charter School
 Northwest Classical Academy

Columbia County
 SAIL - School for Arts Infused Learning

Coweta County

 Coweta Charter Academy
 Odyssey School

Decatur County
 Spring Creek Charter Academy

DeKalb County

 The Community Academy for Architecture and Design (TCAAD)
 Dekalb Brilliance Academy
 Georgia Fugees Academy Charter School
 PEACE Academy Charter School
 Spring Creek Charter Academy

Douglas County

 Delta STEAM Academy
 DREAM Academy Charter School
 Zest Preparatory Academy Charter School

Fayette County
 Liberty Tech Charter School

Fulton County

 Amana Academy
 Atlanta Heights Charter School
 Atlanta SMART Academy
 Atlanta Unbound Academy
 Destination Career Academy of Georgia
 Ethos Classical School
 Fulton Leadership Academy
 Genesis Academy (Boys, Girls)
 Georgia Cyber Academy
 International Charter School of Atlanta
 Ivy Preparatory Academy
 Liberation Academy
 Resurgence Hall Charter School
 Savannah Exploratory Academy
 SLAM Academy of Atlanta

Gwinnett County

 Brookhaven Innovation Academy
 Georgia Connections Academy
 International Charter Academy of Georgia
 Yi Hwang Academy of Language Excellence

Lowndes County
 Scintilla Charter Academy

Mitchell County
 Baconton Community Charter School

Randolph County
 Southwest Georgia STEM Charter Academy

Richmond County
 Georgia School for Innovation & the Classics

Sumter County
 Furlow Charter School

White County
 Mountain Education Charter High School

References